Wizardology: The Book of the Secrets of Merlin is a children's book created and published by The Templar Company plc in the UK, and published by Candlewick Press in America in 2005. The book is marketed as having been written by Merlin, and is the third book in the 'Ology series.

Wizardology is filled with useful spells and magical information.  There are numerous pockets, flaps, secret codes, and scavenger hunts hidden throughout the book.

The publisher was Dugald Steer, while the book was designed by Nghiem Ta, and features the artwork of Helen Ward, Tomislav Tomic, John Howe, and Anne Yvonne Gilbert.

Plot
The book is written by nineteenth century author, wizardologist Merlin purporting to have written the material in ink (needs clarification on what it was actually written in).

Contents
Chapter I: The Work of a Wizard
Chapter II: A Wizard's Map of the World
Chapter III: The Master Wizard's Workshop
Chapter IV: A Wizard's Robes & Tools
Chapter V: Spellcraft
Chapter VI: A Wizard's Loyal Familiars
Chapter VII: A Wizard's Menagerie of Magical Beasts
Chapter VIII: Magical Flight & Flying Carpets
Chapter IX: Potions, Healing & Magical Transformations
Chapter X: Amulets, Talismans & Magical Items
Chapter XI: Divination & Crystal Gazing
Chapter XII: Alchemy, Astronomy & the New Sciences
Chapter XIII: Famous Wizards of History
Conclusion, or The Mystery of Wizardology Revealed and Concealed

Awards and honors
2006: shortlisted for British Children's Book of the Year

In other media

Video games
In October 2007, Codemasters announced a licensing agreement to create video games for the Wii and Nintendo DS based on Wizardology, as well as Dragonology and Pirateology. Nik Nak was to develop the Wii titles.

Film adaptation
On January 31, 2018, Paramount Pictures announced they were in the process of developing a film franchise centred around all 13 Ology books, by setting up a writers room currently consisting of Jeff Pinkner, Michael Chabon, Lindsey Beer, Joe Robert Cole, Nicole Perlman and Christina Hodson. The vision for the franchise is the hope that each of the writers will embrace the books by working with visual artists to create treatments which will eventually evolve into seven movie scripts with interconnected stories. Paramount also announced that Akiva Goldsman will act as overseer and producer of the franchise.

References

External links
Official website of the Ology series
Anne Yvonne Gilbert, Illustrator

2005 children's books
Books by Dugald Steer
Candlewick Press books
Children's fiction books
Works based on Merlin
Books illustrated by Anne Yvonne Gilbert
Books illustrated by Helen Ward
Books illustrated by Nghiem Ta
British children's books